Göçkün is a village in the Amasra District, Bartın Province, Turkey. Its population is 139 (2021).

History 
The name of the village is mentioned as Göçkün in the records of 1928 and as Göçkünşili in the records of 1946.

Geography 
The village is 36 km from Bartın city center and 20 km from Amasra town centre.

References

Villages in Amasra District